Chaminda Indika Wijekoon (born 15 September 1981) is a Sri Lankan middle-distance runner specialising in the 1500 metres. He represented his country at the 2011 World Championships where he reached the semifinals after breaking the national record in the heats. His another major success is the fourth place at the 2010 Commonwealth Games.

Competition record

Personal bests
800 metres – 1:52.12 (Colombo 2009)
1500 metres – 3:39.61 (Daegu 2011) NR
3000 metres – 8:02.91 (Mondovi 2011) NR
5000 metres – 14:11.65 (Pergine Valsugana 2010)
3000 metres steeplechase – 8:57.00 (Bangkok 2006)

References

1981 births
Living people
Sri Lankan male long-distance runners
Sri Lankan male steeplechase runners
Sri Lankan male middle-distance runners
Commonwealth Games competitors for Sri Lanka
Athletes (track and field) at the 2010 Commonwealth Games
Asian Games competitors for Sri Lanka
Athletes (track and field) at the 2006 Asian Games
Athletes (track and field) at the 2010 Asian Games
World Athletics Championships athletes for Sri Lanka
South Asian Games gold medalists for Sri Lanka
South Asian Games silver medalists for Sri Lanka
South Asian Games bronze medalists for Sri Lanka
South Asian Games medalists in athletics
20th-century Sri Lankan people
21st-century Sri Lankan people